Mendicino is a city and comune in the province of Cosenza, Calabria, in Southern Italy.

References

Cities and towns in Calabria